The Huron ReproGraphics Oil Heritage Classic is a bonspiel part of the men's Ontario Curling Tour. The event was introduced in 2012 and is held annually in October, at the Sarnia Golf & Curling Club in Point Edward, Ontario. It became a World Curling Tour event in 2015.

Past Champions

References

World Curling Tour events
Ontario Curling Tour events
Sport in Sarnia